Hussain Ahmad Kanjo (17 August 1985 – 24 May 2020) was a Pakistani politician and Khyber Pakhtunkhwa's former provisional minister for science and technology (2002–2007).

He died from COVID-19 on 24 May 2020 during the COVID-19 pandemic in Pakistan at age 34.

References 

2020 deaths
Jamaat-e-Islami Pakistan politicians
Muttahida Majlis-e-Amal MPAs (Khyber Pakhtunkhwa)
Deaths from the COVID-19 pandemic in Khyber Pakhtunkhwa
Place of birth missing
1985 births
Place of death missing
North-West Frontier Province MPAs 2002–2007